Brian Collins is an American country music artist born and raised in Douglasville, Georgia, United States. Brian has charted two singles on the MusicRow Country Breakout Chart and one single on the Billboard Indicator Chart.

Discography

Singles

References

External links
 

American country singer-songwriters
American male singer-songwriters
Living people
Country musicians from Georgia (U.S. state)
People from Douglasville, Georgia
Year of birth missing (living people)
Singer-songwriters from Georgia (U.S. state)